The person who is the subject of this biography has a Chinese name; his family name is Lee.

Lee Hsin-han (born May 19, 1988) is a Taiwanese professional male tennis player. He specializes in doubles.

ATP Challenger and ITF Futures finals

Singles: 3 (0–3)

Doubles: 73 (32–41)

Davis Cup

Singles performances (1–3) 

RPO/QF = Relegation Play–offs/Quarterfinal

References

External links 
 
 

1988 births
Living people
Asian Games medalists in tennis
Taiwanese male tennis players
Tennis players at the 2006 Asian Games
Tennis players at the 2010 Asian Games
Tennis players at the 2014 Asian Games
Asian Games bronze medalists for Chinese Taipei
Medalists at the 2010 Asian Games
Universiade medalists in tennis
Universiade gold medalists for Chinese Taipei
Universiade silver medalists for Chinese Taipei
Universiade bronze medalists for Chinese Taipei
Medalists at the 2011 Summer Universiade
Medalists at the 2013 Summer Universiade
Medalists at the 2015 Summer Universiade
21st-century Taiwanese people